Marion Township is the name of twelve townships in the U.S. state of Indiana:

 Marion Township, Allen County, Indiana
 Marion Township, Boone County, Indiana
 Marion Township, Decatur County, Indiana
 Marion Township, Dubois County, Indiana
 Marion Township, Hendricks County, Indiana
 Marion Township, Jasper County, Indiana
 Marion Township, Jennings County, Indiana
 Marion Township, Lawrence County, Indiana
 Marion Township, Owen County, Indiana
 Marion Township, Pike County, Indiana
 Marion Township, Putnam County, Indiana
 Marion Township, Shelby County, Indiana

Indiana township disambiguation pages